St. Mary's Orthodox Valiyapally (previously St. Mary's Orthodox Church) is an Orthodox Church, located in Gangamma Circle, Bangalore, India. It is one of the oldest Malankara Orthodox Syrian churches in the city.

The Church belongs to the Bangalore Diocese of the Malankara Orthodox Church, which was founded by St. Thomas, one of the twelve apostles of Jesus Christ,who came to India in A.D. 52.

St. Mary's Orthodox Valiyapally is also the first Orthodox parish in Bangalore to have a Church of its own. The parish is made up of over 300 families till date.

Origins
The Church was started in January 1961, when a decision was taken to form an independent prayer group, under the leadership of Fr Thomas Moothedam. Later, the Asst. Vicar of the Trinity Church, Fr Kuriakose was rounded in to help. In 1964, a full-time vicar Fr. G. John (Fr. John Geevarghese) was appointed, and the Sunday School was started. Initially, services were being conducted in CSI Holy Cross Church.
On 15 August 1966, actual construction of the church began, and was completed in a year. On 5 March 1967, the new Church was consecrated by H.H. Moran Mar Baselios Augen I, Catholicos of the East.

In the year 1977, an English Medium Nursery school was established with the sole purpose of imparting knowledge and inculcating the right values in the tender minds of the children.

Over the years, to accommodate the growing congregation, the existing church was beautifully re-constructed and consecrated on 14 and 15 August 1993 by H.G. Philipose Mar Eusebius. It has remained the same building till date.

The chapel at Mathikere, which was a part of St Mary’s Orthodox Church, was declared as an independent church, St. Gregorios Orthodox Church on 1 January 2001.

To facilitate the number of members from Dasarahalli, a new Church was built at Dasarahalli and was consecrated on 24 December 2006 in the name of Saint Dionysius of Vattasseril. The St. Dionysius Orthodox Church has been growing rapidly with close to 100 families with active membership.

Change of Title

On 25 January 2009, St. Mary's Orthodox Church was declared as St. Mary's Orthodox Valiyapally by the Kalpana of Bava Thirumeni by the then Diocese Bishop H. G Dr. Yakob Mar Irenaios.

Vicars

Special Events
Harvest festival is celebrated every year on 15 August, which also happens to be the Indian Independence day. It involves regular morning Qurbana followed by breakfast and bid function, and lunch in the later part of the day.

Good Friday, Easter, Christmas Eve, Christmas, New Year's Eve and New Year celebrations are also noteworthy.

Activities
The spiritual wing of the Church comprises
 The Sunday School
 Good Samaritan Project Aid
 MGOCSM and Youth League
 Martha Mariam Samajam
 Prayer groups

Present Vicar

At present, the vicar of the church is Rev. Fr. Santhosh Samuel, who has taken charge of the parish since 2022.

Latest developments
A new parsonage and prayer tower/endowment have been constructed and are in use since the beginning of 2013.

Occasionally, two morning Holy Qurbana services are conducted on Sundays.

References

Churches in Bangalore
Malankara Orthodox Syrian church buildings
Churches completed in 1967
Christian organizations established in 1961
1961 establishments in Mysore State
20th-century churches in India
20th-century Oriental Orthodox church buildings